The Southern States Conference (SSC) was an affiliate of the National Association of Intercollegiate Athletics that included member institutions in the U.S. states of Alabama, Georgia, Mississippi, and Florida. The league existed from 1938 to 1997.

History
The league was established in December 1938 as the Alabama Intercollegiate Conference (AIC), comprising schools from just that state. The six charter members were: Jacksonville State Teachers College, Saint Bernard College, Troy State Teachers College, Snead Junior College, Livingston State Teachers College, and Marion Military Institute. The league ceased operations in 1942 because of World War II and because several member schools dropped their intercollegiate athletics programs. The AIC was reformed again in January 1948 after a five year lapse. In 1959 it was renamed the Alabama Collegiate Conference (ACC), and then in May 1972, the league was rebranded as Southern States Conference.

At the conclusion of the 1994–95 school year, two schools left the SSC, causing league membership to dip below the six required to have an NAIA championship in every sport except basketball. The SSC then existed in 1995–96 as a basketball-only conference. It returned to an all-sports conference for 1996–97 before dissolving.

Members

Champions

Football

1939 – Troy State
1940 – 
1941 – Troy State
1942–1946 – None (WWII)
1947 – Jacksonville State
1948 – Jacksonville State
1949 – , Troy State
1950 – 
1951 – 

1952 – 
1953 – 
1954 – 
1955 – 
1956 – 
1957 – , Jacksonville State
1958 – 
1959 – , Jacksonville State
1960 – 

1961 – 
1962 – , Jacksonville State
1963 – , Jacksonville State
1964 – Jacksonville State
1965 – Jacksonville State
1966 – Jacksonville State
1967 – Troy State
1968 – Troy State
1969 – Troy State

References

College sports in Alabama
College sports in Florida
College sports in Georgia (U.S. state)
College sports in Mississippi
Defunct college sports conferences in the United States
1938 establishments in Alabama
1990s disestablishments in Alabama
1990s disestablishments in Georgia (U.S. state)